The Fada Archei Faunal Reserve is located in the north-eastern region of the Chad in its Ennedi Administration region. Its primary aim was to protect Ammotragus lervia (Barbary sheep). It is considered as a Depauperate ecosystem
with vegetation of mostly Acacia and Balanites on the banks of the wadis.

Geography
The reserve located to the south-east of the Fada town. Its terrain in the elevation range of  forms part of the transition zone between the Sahelian and Saharan zones. It is marked by striking feature of a rocky ridge that divides into formations of deep gorges. Barren sand dunes are interlaced with a few wadis. Incidence of mean annual rainfall is very scanty of about  only during July and August.

Vegetation
The gorges in the reserve are forested with riparian forests of Acacia nilotica, Acacia seyal, Adina microcephala, Balanites aegyptiaca, Boscia angustifolia, Ficus spp., and Vitex doniana. The ponds in the reserve are Cyperus, Juncus, Phragmites, Scirpus and Typha. Nymphaea and Potamogeton spp., grow in the ponds.

Fauna
Avi fauna species recorded consist of 13 species of the Sahara–Sindian biome and 10 species of the Sahel biome.

Mammal species noted, in the threatened category, are Panthera leo senegalensis (CR), Acinonyx jubatus soemmeringii (VU), Addax nasomaculatus (CR), Ammotragus lervia (VU) and Gazella dorcas (VU).

Aqua fauna recorded in the water bodies in the reserve are 16 species of endemic fish. Some of the species are blackstripe barb, Coptodon zillii, and Labeo tibestii.

Conservation
As the reserve is in the extreme north eastern region of the country it is mostly undisturbed. Apart from grazing of cattle by local nomads, poaching is also prevalent to some degree. Due to civil strife in Chad since 1972  there has been a lack of personnel and equipment for providing security against conservation and poaching.

References

Faunal reserves
Protected areas of Chad